The canton of Calais-2 is an administrative division of the Pas-de-Calais department, in northern France. It was created at the French canton reorganisation which came into effect in March 2015. Its seat is in Calais.

It consists of the following communes: 

Alembon
Andres 
Ardres
Les Attaques
Autingues
Bainghen
Balinghem
Bouquehault
Boursin
Brêmes
Caffiers
Calais (partly)
Campagne-lès-Guines
Coulogne
Fiennes
Guînes 
Hardinghen
Herbinghen
Hermelinghen
Hocquinghen
Landrethun-lès-Ardres
Licques
Louches
Nielles-lès-Ardres
Rodelinghem
Sanghen

References

Cantons of Pas-de-Calais